In game theory a move by nature is a decision or move in an extensive form game made by a player who has no strategic interests in the outcome.  The effect is to add a player, 'Nature', whose practical role is to act as a random number generator.  For instance, if a game of Poker requires a dealer to choose which cards a player is dealt, the dealer plays the role of the Nature player.

Fig. 1 shows a signaling game which begins with a move by nature.  Moves by nature are an integral part of games of incomplete information.

References
 

Game theory